The women's pole vault competition at the 2016 Summer Olympics in Rio de Janeiro, Brazil. The event was held at the Olympic Stadium between 16–19 August.

Summary
It took a clean round to 4.55 m to qualify.  Holly Bradshaw, Lisa Ryzih, Jennifer Suhr, Eliza McCartney, Yarisley Silva and Martina Strutz already had misses and had to jump 4.60.  All but Strutz did it on their first attempt.  Ekaterini Stefanidi had passed the lower heights and took her only attempt at 4.60, which was successful to qualify.

In the final, 4.60 proved to be the end of the line as both returning Olympic medalists from 2012, Suhr and Silva topped out. They left tied with one miss each. 2012 bronze medalist Yelena Isinbayeva did not return because Russia's athletics team was suspended from international competition for state-sponsored doping. Isinbayeva later announced her retirement. Six women were able to clear 4.70, McCartney and Stefanidi were tied with the lead, each without a miss. Stefanidi missed her first attempt at 4.80, so when McCartney remained perfect, she took the lead. Stefanidi, Sandi Morris and Alana Boyd all cleared on their second attempt. After missing her first attempt at 4.80, Nicole Büchler saved her two remaining attempts for 4.85 (she missed both). Morris followed with a clearance of her own. When McCartney and Boyd were unable to clear the bar, Morris was guaranteed silver. Neither were able to clear , though on Morris' last attempt, knowing it was all or nothing for the gold medal, it looked like she was well over the bar, her thigh just catching the bar on the way down to dislodge it. 19-year-old McCartney equaled her National Record, set in March 2016.

The medals were presented by Irena Szewińska and Svein Arne Hansen.

Competition format
The competition consisted of two rounds, qualification and final. In qualification, each athlete had three attempts at each height and is eliminated if she failed to clear any height. Athletes who successfully jumped the qualifying height moved on the final. If fewer than 12 reached that height, the best 12 moved on. Cleared heights were reset for the final, which followed the same three-attempts-per-height format until all athletes reach a height they can not jump.

Schedule
All times are Brasilia Time (UTC-3)

Records
, the existing World and Olympic records were as follows.

The following national record was established during the competition:

Results

Qualifying round 
Qualification rule: Qualifying performance 4.60 (Q) or at least 12 best performers (q) advance to the Final.

Final

References

Women's pole vault
Pole vault at the Olympics
Women's events at the 2016 Summer Olympics